The 2017 Kent County Council election was held on 4 May 2017 as part of the 2017 local elections in the United Kingdom. All 81 councillors were elected from 72 electoral divisions, each of which returned either one or two county councillors by first-past-the-post voting for a four-year term of office. The Conservative Party retained control. UKIP, previously the second-largest party on the council, lost all their seats.

The Liberal Democrats regained status as the second largest party, which they had been from 2009 to 2013.  A notable triumph for Liberal Democrats was Antony Hook winning the Faversham division, which had been considered a "safe" Conservative seat.  Antony Hook's campaign increased the Liberal Democrat vote share from 4% in 2013 to a winning 43%.  Faversham also saw the largest turnout of any seat. The Labour Party lost seats, including those of their Leader Roger Truelove and previous leaders Gordon Cowan and Dr. Mike Eddy. The Labour vote share also fell but they retained status as 3rd party.

Ward boundary changes took effect at this election after a review of the county by the Local Government Boundary Commission for England. Kent saw a large turnover of councillors.  Of the 81 councillors elected in 2017, 39 had not served in the previous council.

Results

|}

Results by district

Ashford

Canterbury 
* This constituency boundaries for Canterbury were redrawn and percentage changes should thus be taken as rough approximations, particularly for the previously two-seat Whitstable constituency.

Dartford

Dover

Folkestone & Hythe

* All of the Folkestone & Hythe constituencies bar two were reorganised, therefore percentage changes have only been given for Elham Valley and Romney Marsh.

Gravesham

Maidstone

Sevenoaks

Swale 
There are five single-member constituencies and one multi-member constituency within the District of Swale, which elect a total of seven councillors to Kent County Council. The electoral map of Swale was redrawn as a result of boundary changes which saw the old Swale Central multi-member ward split to create Sittingbourne North and Sittingbourne South, both single member divisions. Sheerness and Sheppey Divisions were merged to create the new Multi-member Sheppey Division. Swale District includes the Division of Faversham which saw Liberal Democrat Antony Hook winning the Faversham division, which had been considered a "safe" Conservative seat.  Antony Hook's campaign increased the Liberal Democrat vote share from 4% in 2013 to a winning 43%.  Faversham also saw the largest turnout of any seat. Boundary changes meant that Below are the results:

Thanet 

* Previously the one seat Birchington and Villages division.

* Previously a two seat division.

* Previously Margate West, as well as part of the Cliftonville division.

Tonbridge and Malling
There are five single-member constituencies and one multi-member constituency within the District of Tonbridge and Malling, which elect a total of seven councillors to Kent County Council. Below are the results:

Tunbridge Wells

References

2017
2017 English local elections
2010s in Kent